Quite Interesting Limited is a British research company, most notable for providing the research for the British television panel game QI (itself an abbreviation of Quite Interesting) and the Swedish version Intresseklubben, as well as other QI–related programmes and products. The company founder and chairman is John Lloyd, the creator and producer of QI, and host of the radio panel game The Museum of Curiosity, which also uses Quite Interesting Limited for its research. John Mitchinson is the company's director and also works as head of research for QI.

About
Lloyd founded Quite Interesting Limited in 1999. It is claimed that the idea of founding the company came on Christmas Eve 1993. According to his profile on QI.com, "he came to the sudden and alarming realisation that he didn't really know anything. Changing gear again, he started reading books for the first time since he was 17. To his horror, he discovered that he hadn't been paying attention and, with painful slowness, unearthed the closely guarded secret that the universe is astoundingly quite interesting."

The philosophy of the company is that it claims that there are four primal drives: food, sex, shelter and curiosity. Out of these, curiosity is supposedly the most important because, "unlike the other three drives, it is what makes us uniquely human." The company claims that, "Whatever is interesting we are interested in. Whatever is not interesting, we are even more interested in. Everything is interesting if looked at in the right way."

Those who carry out research are known as the "QI Elves". Notable elves include Justin Pollard and Vitali Vitaliev. They are also responsible for helping to write the questions used on QI. People wishing to become elves are recommended to start by commenting on the forums of the QI website.

Products

DVDs

Books

References

QI
Companies based in Oxford
British companies established in 1999
Privately held companies of the United Kingdom